Rhaphidophora foraminifera is a species of flowering plant in the family Araceae. It is native to Borneo, Sumatra and Peninsular Malaysia.

References

foraminifera
Flora of Malesia
Plants described in 1898